Gaurika Singh (born 26 November 2002) is a Nepali swimmer. She has held many national records since beginning her swimming career at the young age of eight. She has set the record of winning 4  gold medals in a season of the 2019 South Asian games held in Nepal. She won two silver and three bronze medals for swimming at the 2016 South Asian Games. She also participated at the 2016 Summer Olympics, Rio de Janeiro, Brazil, as the youngest Olympian, representing Nepal in the Women's 100m backstroke. She has been included in Forbes 30 Under 30 Asia 2021 Entertainment and Sports list.

Personal life 
Gaurika Singh originally hails from Bhimdutta municipality, Kanchanpur but now lives and trains in London, United Kingdom at the Camden Swiss Cottage Swimming Club under coach Adam Taylor, who has produced world-class swimmers. Singh is also currently the good-will ambassador of the Shanti Education Initiative Nepal (SEIN).

Singh's father, Paras Singh, often accompanies and supports her around the world.

Singh studied at Haberdashers' Girls’ School and Belmont Mill Hill Preparatory School.

Singh is currently studying in Tufts University.

Summer Olympics 2016 

At 13 years and 255 days, Singh was the youngest athlete to compete at the 2016 Rio Olympics. She won heat 1 of the 100m Backstroke in a time of 1:08:45 but did not qualify for the semifinals. Singh finished in 31st place.

Summer Olympics 2020 
At the age of 18 years 8 months 2 days, Singh competed at 2020 Tokyo Olympic. She secured 3rd position of heat 1 of the 100m Freestyle in a time of 1:00:11. Singh managed to set the national record but didn’t qualify for semi-finals. Singh finished in 50th position.

Achievements

References

External links
 

Official Facebook page
100m backstroke national record in the 2015 FINA World Championship
Interview with Nepalisite at SEIN
Interview with Terai Television
Interview with CBBC Newsround
Gaurika Singh, rio.com
Tough talk with Olympian Gaurika and Garima Rana - Kantipur Television

Nepalese female swimmers
Living people
Olympic swimmers of Nepal
2002 births
Sportspeople from Kathmandu
People educated at Haberdashers' Girls' School
Nepalese female freestyle swimmers
Female backstroke swimmers
Female breaststroke swimmers
Female medley swimmers
Swimmers at the 2016 Summer Olympics
Swimmers at the 2020 Summer Olympics
Nepalese expatriates in the United Kingdom
Swimmers at the 2018 Asian Games
South Asian Games silver medalists for Nepal
South Asian Games bronze medalists for Nepal
Asian Games competitors for Nepal
South Asian Games medalists in swimming
21st-century Nepalese women